is a Japanese footballer.

Club statistics
Updated to 15 February 2017.

References

External links

1993 births
Living people
Kansai University alumni
Association football people from Hyōgo Prefecture
Japanese footballers
Association football midfielders
J2 League players
Kyoto Sanga FC players
Japanese expatriate footballers
Japanese expatriate sportspeople in South Korea
Expatriate footballers in South Korea
K League 2 players
Seoul E-Land FC players
Suzuka Point Getters players
Japan Football League players